The 1999 UEFA–CAF Meridian Cup was the second UEFA–CAF Meridian Cup and was held in South Africa.

Teams

  (host nation)

Group stage
In the following tables:

Key:
Pld Matches played, W Won, D Drawn, L Lost, GF Goals for, GA Goals against, GD Goal Difference, Pts Points

Group A

Group B

Knockout stage

UEFA–CAF Meridian Cup
Mer
UEFA
1999
Meridan